The Ghaem (also known as MIG-S-1800) is a class of general-purpose patrol craft. The vessel is assembled in Iran, by Shahid Joolaee Marine Industries.

Its primary operators include the Navy of the Islamic Revolutionary Guard Corps, as well as the Islamic Republic of Iran Navy, which operates them in the Northern Fleet. Iran has also exported Ghaem-class patrol boats to Syrian Armed Forces.

References 

Ship classes of the Islamic Revolutionary Guard Corps
Naval ships of Syria
Ships built at Shahid Julaei shipyard
Ship classes of the Islamic Republic of Iran Navy
Iran–Syria military relations